Kazuo Ueda (植田 和男, うえだ かずお, September 20, 1951) is a Japanese economist. In April 2023, he will be inaugurated as governor of the Bank of Japan.

He is a professor emeritus at University of Tokyo and now working as a professor at Kyoritsu Women's University. He was a dean of Faculty of Economics at University of Tokyo and a president of the Japanese Economic Association.

Biography 
He graduated from the University of Tokyo with a Bachelor of Science in Mathematics and then studied at Faculty of Economics, under Hirofumi Uzawa, Ryutaro Komiya, and Koichi Hamada.

In 1980, Ueda received his Ph.D. in economics from the Massachusetts Institute of Technology. His doctoral advisor was Stanley Fischer.

After working at the University of British Columbia and Osaka University, he joined the University of Tokyo in 1989, retiring in 2017 to become Professor Emeritus of the University of Tokyo.

From April 2011 to June 2012, he was a president of the Japan Economic Association.

Japanese Works

単著 

 国際マクロ経済学と日本経済 開放経済体系の理論と実証 東洋経済新報社, 1983
 戦後の経済変動と経常収支 大蔵省財政金融研究所, 1986
 国際収支不均衡下の金融政策 東洋経済新報社, 1992 ISBN 4492651578
 ゼロ金利との闘い 日銀の金融政策を総括する 日本経済新聞社, 2005 ISBN 4532351839
 大学4年間の金融学が10時間でざっと学べる 中経出版, 2017

共著 

 円・ドルレート:1973-1985 吉田康 大蔵省財政金融研究所, 1986
 企業間株式持合の経済的影響の分析 東京大学, 1990
 金融・入門 三日間の経済学 翁邦雄 JICC出版局, 1991 ISBN 4796601449
 戦後日本の資金配分 産業政策と民間銀行 岡崎哲二, 奥野正寛ほか 東京大学出版会, 2002 ISBN 4130401866

編著 

 パースペクティブ日本経済 円高シフトの構造と方向 伊藤元重, 竹中平蔵共編 筑摩書房, 1988 ISBN 4480854460
 90年代の国際金融 深尾光洋共編 日本経済新聞社, 1991 ISBN 4532130115
 変革期の金融システム 貝塚啓明共編 東京大学出版会, 1994 ISBN 4130401416
 金融空洞化の経済分析 深尾光洋ほか共編 日本経済新聞社, 1996 ISBN 453213109X
 日本経済事典 伊藤元重, 小峰隆夫, 猪木武徳, 加護野忠男, 樋口美雄共編 日本経済新聞社, 1996 ISBN 4532145007
 世界金融・経済危機の全貌 原因・波及・政策対応 慶應義塾大学出版会, 2010 ISBN 9784766417753

Reference

External links 

 植田和男 - 共立女子大学
 講演・記者会見 植田和男 - Bank of Japan

1951 births
Living people
20th-century Japanese economists
21st-century Japanese economists
People from Shizuoka Prefecture
Academic staff of the University of Tokyo
Academic staff of Osaka University
Academic staff of the University of British Columbia
University of Tokyo alumni
Massachusetts Institute of Technology alumni